Douglas Richard Flutie (born October 23, 1962) is an American former professional football player who was a quarterback for 21 seasons. He played 12 seasons in the National Football League (NFL), eight seasons in the Canadian Football League (CFL), and one season in the United States Football League (USFL). 

A high school standout from Natick, Massachusetts, Flutie played college football at Boston College, where he won the Heisman Trophy in 1984 amid a season that saw him throw the game-winning touchdown pass in the final seconds against Miami. He chose to begin his professional career with the USFL's New Jersey Generals; as Flutie had already begun playing with the Generals, NFL teams mostly ignored the Heisman winner. This resulted in him being selected 285th overall by the Los Angeles Rams in the 11th round of the 1985 NFL Draft, the lowest drafting of a Heisman winner. After the USFL folded, Flutie played his first four NFL seasons with the Chicago Bears and New England Patriots.

Flutie left the NFL in 1990 for the CFL, where he became regarded as one of the league's greatest players. As a member of the BC Lions, Calgary Stampeders, and Toronto Argonauts, Flutie was named the CFL's Most Outstanding Player a record six times and won three Grey Cups. In all three of his championship victories, two with the Argonauts and one with the Stampeders, he was named Grey Cup MVP.

Following his CFL success, Flutie returned to the NFL in 1998 with the Buffalo Bills, earning Pro Bowl and NFL Comeback Player of the Year honors for leading Buffalo to the playoffs. He again helped the Bills obtain a playoff berth the following season, but was controversially benched in their subsequent Wild Card defeat; Flutie would be the last quarterback to bring the Bills to the postseason over the next 17 years. Flutie held his last starting role with the San Diego Chargers in 2001 and spent his final professional season as a backup for the Patriots. He was inducted to the College Football Hall of Fame in 2007 and the Canadian Football Hall of Fame in 2008. Flutie was also inducted to Canada's Sports Hall of Fame in 2007, becoming the first non-Canadian inductee.

Early years
Flutie was born in Manchester, Maryland to Dick and Joan Flutie. His paternal great-grandparents were Lebanese immigrants. His family moved to Melbourne Beach, Florida when he was six, where his father worked as a quality engineer in the aerospace industry. While there, Flutie led Hoover Junior High School's football team to two Brevard County Championships. 

After the dramatic slow-down of the space program in the mid-1970s, the Flutie family again moved in 1976 to Natick, Massachusetts, 20 miles west of Boston. Flutie graduated from Natick High School, where he was an All-League performer in football, basketball, and baseball.

College years

Flutie played football at Boston College, the only Division I-A school to recruit him, from 1981 to 1984, and won the Heisman Trophy, Maxwell Award, and the Davey O'Brien National Quarterback Award in his senior year (1984). Flutie became the first quarterback to win the Heisman since Pat Sullivan in 1971. Flutie left school as the NCAA's all-time passing yardage leader with 10,579 yards and was a consensus All-American as a senior. He earned Player of the Year awards from UPI, Kodak, The Sporting News, and the Maxwell Football Club. The quarterback coach for Boston College from 1981 to 1983 was Tom Coughlin.

Flutie gained national attention in 1984 when he led the Eagles to victory in a high-scoring, back-and-forth game against the Miami Hurricanes (led by QB Bernie Kosar). The game was nationally televised on CBS the day after Thanksgiving and thus had a huge audience. Miami staged a dramatic drive to take the lead, 45–41, in the closing minute of the game. Boston College then took possession at its own 22-yard line with 28 seconds to go. After two passes moved the ball another 30 yards, only 6 seconds remained. On the last play of the game, Flutie scrambled away from the defense and threw a "Hail Mary pass" that was caught in the end zone by Gerard Phelan, giving BC a 47–45 win. Flutie won the Heisman trophy a week later, but the voting had finished before the game; Flutie said, however, that "without the Hail Mary pass I think I could have been very, very easily forgotten".

The subsequent rise in applications for admission to Boston College after Flutie's "Hail Mary" gave rise to the admissions phenomenon known as the "Flutie Effect". This idea essentially states that a winning sports team can increase the recognition value of a school enough to make it more attractive to potential applicants.

In addition to his collegiate athletic achievement, Flutie maintained a distinguished academic record at Boston College, where he majored in communication and computer science. Flutie was a candidate for the Rhodes Scholarship, for which he was named a finalist in 1984. Upon graduating, Flutie won the National Football Foundation post-graduate scholarship.

In November 2008, Flutie was honored by Boston College with a statue of him throwing his famous "Hail Mary" pass outside of Alumni Stadium. His number, 22, has been retired by the Boston College football program.

College statistics

Professional career

USFL career

Despite his successful college achievements, whether Flutie was too small to play professional football was uncertain. When asked on television "Can a guy who's five-foot-nine, 175 pounds make it in the pros?", he answered "Yes, he can. But it's a matter of ability and not size. I feel I can play; I don't know for sure, and those questions will be answered in the future."

Flutie was seen as extremely attractive to the USFL, which was desperate for a star to reinvigorate the league as it was in financial difficulty. Meanwhile, the Buffalo Bills, who had the first pick of the 1985 NFL Draft, still had the rights to Jim Kelly (who had earlier spurned them to go to the USFL) and also had concerns about Flutie's height. He was selected by the USFL's New Jersey Generals in the 1985 territorial draft, which took place in January, months before the 1985 NFL Draft. Flutie went through negotiations with the Generals and agreed on a deal that would make him the highest paid pro football player and highest paid rookie in any sport with $7 million over five years; Flutie was officially signed on February 4, 1985. Having already signed with the USFL, Flutie was not selected in the NFL Draft until the 11th round as the 285th overall pick by the Los Angeles Rams.

Flutie entered the USFL with much hype and fanfare. However, many began to wonder if the scouts who said Flutie could not compete on the pro level were right, despite the plenitude of great NFL quarterbacks with awful initial professional seasons. In February 1985, Flutie made his USFL debut against the Orlando Renegades. His debut was not impressive, as his first two professional passes were intercepted by Renegades linebacker Jeff Gabrielsen. The only two touchdowns that New Jersey scored came from turnovers by Orlando quarterback Jerry Golsteyn. By the time Flutie's debut was over, he completed 7 of 18 passes, for a total of 174 yards, while running for 51 yards. Flutie completed 134 of 281 passes for 2,109 yards and 13 touchdowns with the Generals in 1985 in 15 games. He suffered an injury late in the season that saw him turn over the reins to reserve quarterback Ron Reeves. The Generals went on to sport an 11–7 record and a second-place finish in the USFL's Eastern Conference. The USFL folded in 1986, and Flutie and punter Sean Landeta were the league's last active players in the NFL.

National Football League debut
On October 14, 1986, the Los Angeles Rams traded their rights to Flutie to the Chicago Bears in exchange for multiple draft picks. Flutie appeared in 4 games for the 1986 Chicago Bears.

Chicago then traded Flutie to the New England Patriots at the start of the 1987 NFL season, a season which saw the NFL Players Association go on strike, and NFL games subsequently being played by replacement players. Flutie crossed the picket lines in order to play for the Patriots, one of many NFL players to rejoin their respective teams, and the strike quickly collapsed. 

On October 2, 1988, after the Patriots started the season a miserable 1–3, Flutie came off the bench to lead a thrilling comeback victory over the Indianapolis Colts in Foxborough, scoring the winning touchdown on a 13-yard bootleg at the end of the fourth quarter. He then led the team to a 6–3 record, including wins at home over the eventual division winning Cincinnati Bengals and Chicago Bears. But even after taking the Patriots to the brink of the playoffs, and in a precursor to what would happen to him eleven years later with Buffalo, Flutie was benched by head coach Raymond Berry on December 11, replacing him with Tony Eason, who had not played football in over a year. New England lost the last game of the year in Denver and were eliminated from the postseason in a tiebreaker.

Flutie would remain with the Patriots through 1989. They then released him after the season, and embarked on the worst three year stretch in team history, winning nine games, with no effectiveness or leadership from the quarterback position.

After six months with no interest from or initiative taken by any NFL team, Flutie left to play in the Canadian Football League.

Canadian Football League career
Flutie played in the Canadian Football League for eight years. He is considered one of the greatest players in Canadian football history. In 1990, he signed with the BC Lions for a two-year contract reportedly worth $350,000 a season. At the time he was the highest paid player in the CFL. Flutie struggled in his first season, which would be his only losing season in the CFL. In his second season, he threw for a pro football record 6,619 yards on 466 completions. Flutie was rewarded with a reported million-dollar salary from the Calgary Stampeders.

Flutie won his first Grey Cup in 1992 with the Stampeders. He was named the Grey Cup MVP. During his last years in Calgary, Flutie's backup was Jeff Garcia, who later went on to start for the NFL's San Francisco 49ers. Flutie won two more Grey Cups with the Toronto Argonauts, in 1996 (The Snow Bowl, held in Hamilton, Ontario) and 1997 (held in Edmonton, Alberta), before signing with the Buffalo Bills of the National Football League in 1998. Prior to his final two Grey Cup victories with the Argonauts, Flutie was hampered by the opinion, supported by the media, that he was a quarterback who could not win in cold weather. In both 1993 and 1994, the Stampeders had the best record in the league, but lost the Western Final each year at home in freezing conditions. After first refusing to wear gloves in freezing temperatures, in later years Flutie adapted to throwing with gloves in cold weather.

Flutie credits his time in the CFL with helping him develop as a pro quarterback. Flutie specifically states that he modeled his game off of fellow CFL quarterback Damon Allen.

His CFL career statistics include 41,355 passing yards and 270 touchdowns. He holds the professional football record of 6,619 yards passing in a single season. He led the league in passing five times in only eight seasons. He once held four of the CFL's top five highest single-season completion marks, including a record 466 in 1991 which was surpassed by Ricky Ray in 2005. His 48 touchdown passes in 1994 remains a CFL record. He won three Grey Cup MVP awards, and was named the CFL's Most Outstanding Player a record six times (1991–1994 and 1996–1997). He passed 5,000+ yards six times in his career and remains the only player in pro football history to pass 6,000+ yards in a season twice in his career.

On November 17, 2006, Flutie was named the greatest Canadian Football League player of all time from a top 50 list of CFL players conducted by TSN. In 2007, he was named to Canada's Sports Hall of Fame, the first non-Canadian to be inducted.

Return to the NFL

Buffalo Bills
The Buffalo Bills' then-pro personnel director A. J. Smith convinced the organization that Flutie would be a great asset to the team, and the Bills signed him in the 1998 offseason. The Bills' attempt at making Todd Collins their starting quarterback was a failure, and Flutie was one of two quarterbacks, the other being Rob Johnson (the presumptive starter), to join the Bills in the 1998 offseason. In his first action with the Bills, Flutie entered for an injured Johnson and passed for two TDs while leading a fourth-quarter comeback against the Indianapolis Colts on October 11, 1998. The following week, Flutie made his first NFL start since October 15, 1989, against the unbeaten Jacksonville Jaguars. The nine-year gap between starts for a quarterback in the NFL is the third-longest in duration behind Tommy Maddox (December 12, 1992 to October 6, 2002) and the man Flutie replaced, Todd Collins (December 14, 1997 to December 16, 2007). Flutie was the hero of the Bills' victory as he scored the winning touchdown against the Jaguars by rolling out on a bootleg and into the end zone on a fourth-down play in the waning seconds. The Bills' success continued with Flutie at the helm; his record as a starter that season was 8 wins and 3 losses. He then threw for 360 yards in a wild card playoff loss at Miami. Flutie was selected to play in the 1998 Pro Bowl and is currently the shortest quarterback to make the Pro Bowl since 1970.

Flutie led the Bills to a 10–5 record in 1999 but, in a controversial decision which football analyst Aaron Schatz said was "the wrong decision on one of the most mismatched quarterback controversies of all time", was replaced by Johnson for the playoffs by coach Wade Phillips, who later said he was ordered by Bills owner Ralph Wilson to do so. Rob Johnson completed only ten passes, none for touchdowns, and was sacked six times, as the Bills lost 22–16 to the eventual AFC Champion Tennessee Titans. The game has become known as the Music City Miracle, as the Titans scored on the penultimate play of the game– a kickoff return following the Bills' apparent game-clinching field goal.

The following season, Flutie was named the Bills' backup and played only late in games or when Johnson was injured, which was often. During the season, Flutie had a 4–1 record as a starter, in while Johnson's was 4–7. In a December 24, 2000 game against the Seattle Seahawks, Flutie achieved a perfect passer rating, completing 20 of 25 passes for 366 yards and three touchdowns. After the 2000 season, Bills President Tom Donahoe and head coach Gregg Williams decided to keep Johnson as the starter and cut Flutie.

San Diego Chargers
In 2001, Flutie signed with the San Diego Chargers, who had gone 1–15 in 2000. After opening 3–0, the Chargers slumped and were 4–2 going into Week 7, when Flutie's Chargers met Rob Johnson's Bills. Flutie prevailed as the new ex-Bill broke a sack attempt and ran 13 yards for the game-winning touchdown. It would be the last win for the Chargers in 2001, as they dropped their last nine games to finish 5–11 and cost head coach Mike Riley his job. (Buffalo finished 3–13 with Johnson and, later, Alex Van Pelt as starters.) Flutie was Drew Brees' backup in 2002. Brees idolized Flutie growing up, and credits Flutie with mentoring him during their time together with San Diego.

In 2003, Flutie replaced a struggling Brees when the Chargers were 1–7. The 41-year-old Flutie became the oldest player to score two rushing touchdowns in a game, the first player over 40 to accomplish that feat. He also became the oldest AFC Offensive Player of the Week, winning the award for the fourth time. On January 2, 2005, the season finale of the 2004 season, Flutie broke Jerry Rice's record set two weeks prior, to become the oldest player ever to score a touchdown, at 42 years and 71 days. Rice was 42 years and 67 days when he made his touchdown. Flutie's record as a starter that year was 2–3. He was released from the Chargers on March 13, 2005.

Return to the Patriots
Flutie surprised many when he signed with the New England Patriots instead of the New York Giants. He became the backup behind Tom Brady and played several times at the end of games to take a few snaps. Flutie has a 37–28 record as an NFL starter, including a 22–9 record in home games.

Referring to his time in the Canadian Football League (and, presumably, to the quarterback's relatively diminutive stature), television football commentator John Madden once said, "Inch for inch, Flutie in his prime was the best QB of his generation."

In a December 26, 2005 game against the New York Jets, Flutie was sent in late in the game. The Jets also sent in their back-up quarterback, Vinny Testaverde. This was the first time in NFL history that two quarterbacks over the age of 40 competed against each other (Testaverde was 42, Flutie was 43).

In the Patriots' regular-season finale against the Miami Dolphins on January 1, 2006, Flutie successfully drop kicked a football for an extra point, something that was not done in a regular-season NFL game since 1941. It was Flutie's first kick attempt in the NFL, and earned him that week's title of AFC Special Teams Player of the Week. Patriots head coach Bill Belichick, known for his knowledge of the history of the game, made comments that suggested that the play was a retirement present of sorts for his veteran quarterback, although Flutie made no comment on whether 2005 would be his last season. There is a video of Flutie describing the event in his own words.

During the 2006 off-season, Flutie's agent Kristen Kuliga stated he was interested in returning to the Patriots for another season; as a result, he was widely expected to return, despite his age. However, on May 15, 2006, Flutie announced his decision to "hang up his helmet" at the age of 43 and retire. Flutie was the second-to-last former USFL player to retire, behind Sean Landeta.

Flutie has the most rushing yards (212) for any player after turning 40 years old.

Near-return to the CFL
Because of injuries with the Toronto Argonauts, Flutie was contemplating a temporary comeback with the team as of July 25, 2006. Flutie did not plan to play long-term, for he had planned on doing college football commentary on ESPN in the coming season. On August 18, 2006, a story was published on CFL.ca examining this topic in-depth. Flutie was pondering a return to the CFL because of his relationship with Argonauts head coach and former running back Pinball Clemons, and the desire to "say goodbye to the CFL". According to the report, Flutie was poised to return to Toronto on July 22, after their victory over the Saskatchewan Roughriders and the injury to backup quarterback Spergon Wynn. Nevertheless, Flutie chose to remain in retirement.

Career statistics

* Flutie only saw game action in 10 of the 11 games he dressed for during the 1995 season.

Broadcasting career
After retirement from the NFL, Flutie took a commentating job calling college football with ESPN and ABC from 2006 until 2008.

Drawing on his USFL experience, Flutie served as an analyst for United Football League games for Versus in 2010.

Flutie served as a studio and pre-game analyst for Notre Dame Football on NBC from 2011 through 2013, then served as the lead analyst from 2014 through 2019.

Dancing with the Stars
On March 8, 2016, Flutie was announced as one of the celebrities who would compete on season 22 of Dancing with the Stars. He was partnered with professional dancer Karina Smirnoff. On April 25, 2016, Flutie and Smirnoff were eliminated, finishing in ninth place.

Doug Flutie's Maximum Football Video Game
On November 20, 2018, a partnership deal was announced between Flutie and the Maximum Football video game (Canuck Play/Spear Interactive). Future iterations of the game will be rebranded as Doug Flutie's Maximum Football and feature Flutie's likeness. The game released on the PS4 and Xbox One in the Fall of 2019. On February 4, 2020, the game was available to purchase as a physical copy. The game had 29 players at its all time peak, according to SteamDB.

Personal life
Flutie is the older brother of the CFL's fourth all-time receptions leader, Darren Flutie. Flutie also has an older brother, Bill, and an older sister, Denise. His nephew Billy Flutie (son of Bill) was a wide receiver/punter at Boston College from 2007 to 2010. Another of Flutie's nephews, Troy (son of Darren), played quarterback and wide receiver for Boston College from 2015 to 2017. Flutie is the second son of Richard and Joan Flutie. Flutie is married to his high school sweetheart, Laurie (née Fortier). They have a daughter, Alexa, formerly a New England Patriots Cheerleader and San Diego Chargers Cheerleader, and a son, Doug Jr, who has autism. The Fluties established The Doug Flutie Jr. Foundation for Autism, Inc. in honor of him. Flutie also created a cereal, Flutie Flakes, with the benefits going toward this organization. In his free time, he attends college football and basketball games at his alma mater Boston College and was a season ticket-holder. He has spent his summers in Bethany Beach, Delaware, frequenting basketball courts. He also has worked with the local Massachusetts Eastern Bank and is a spokesman for Natick/Framingham's Metrowest Medical Center. He is a member of the Longfellow Sports Clubs at their Wayland and Natick locations. Flutie relocated from Natick to Florida, but was honored by Natick in November 2007 by being inducted into the Natick High School Wall of Achievement. A short stretch of road connecting the Natick Mall and the Shoppers World in Natick/Framingham, Massachusetts is named "Flutie Pass" in honor of his historic 1984 play against Miami.

Flutie frequents Melbourne Beach, Florida in winter, and a sports field complex there is named after him.

For a time, he was part-owner of a restaurant in New York City's South Street Seaport named "Flutie's."

In February 2021, Flutie won the WWE 24/7 Championship from R-Truth during a celebrity flag football tournament, though he would then immediately drop the title back to Truth.

With his brother Darren on guitar, Doug plays drums in the Flutie Brothers Band, and once played for Boston at a tribute honoring Doug. November 13, 2006 was Doug Flutie Day in Boston. Flutie endorsed Scott Brown for the U.S. Senate in Massachusetts for 2010, and the Flutie Brothers Band played at Brown's victory celebration.
In 2014, Flutie, who has a charity team that was running, decided to run the Boston Marathon two days before the race, and finished in 5:23:54.

On November 18, 2015, Flutie's parents Dick and Joan Flutie died of heart attacks one hour apart. Dick Flutie had been ill and hospitalized.

Halls of Fame
 In 2007, Flutie was inducted into the Boston College Varsity Club Hall of Fame.
 On May 8, 2007, Flutie was elected to Canada's Sports Hall of Fame, becoming the first non-Canadian inductee.
 On May 9, 2007, Flutie was elected to the College Football Hall of Fame in his first year of eligibility.
 On April 2, 2008, Flutie was elected to the Canadian Football Hall of Fame in his first year of eligibility.
 In 2009, Flutie was elected to the Ontario Sports Hall of Fame.

Legacy
 Holds the professional football record of 6,619 yards passing in a single season. 
 Holds the CFL record for most touchdown passes in a season with 48 in 1994.
 Was named the CFL's Most Outstanding Player a record six times (1991–1994 and 1996–1997). 
 He remains the only player in pro football history to pass 6,000+ yards in a season twice in his career.
 In 2006, he was named the greatest Canadian Football League player of all time from a top 50 list of CFL players conducted by TSN. In 2007, he was named to Canada's Sports Hall of Fame, the first non-Canadian to be inducted.
 Is the oldest NFL player to score two rushing touchdowns in a game.
 Is the oldest player to win the AFC Offensive Player of the Week award.
 Flutie has the most rushing yards (212) for any player after turning 40 years old.
 In football historian Brad Oremland's ranking of the best quarterbacks in history Doug Flutie came in at #31 based on his performances in the NFL as well as his complete dominance of the CFL for years.
 In a 2013 ranking of the best quarterbacks based on age-related performance, sports analyst Neil Paine ranked Doug Flutie 4th best, though he does state that this could be entirely due to Doug Flutie's uniquely demarcated career. 
 John Madden called said that “Inch for inch, Flutie in his prime was the best QB of his generation.”

See also
 NFL quarterbacks who have posted a perfect passer rating
 List of gridiron football quarterbacks passing statistics
 List of NCAA Division I FBS quarterbacks with at least 10,000 career passing yards
 List of NCAA major college football yearly passing leaders
 List of NCAA major college football yearly total offense leaders

References

Further reading

External links

 
 
 
 

1962 births
Living people
Activists from Maryland
All-American college football players
American Conference Pro Bowl players
American expatriates in Canada
American football drop kickers
American football quarterbacks
American people of Lebanese descent
American philanthropists
American players of Canadian football
Autism activists
BC Lions players
Boston College Eagles football players
Buffalo Bills players
Calgary Stampeders players
Canadian Football Hall of Fame inductees
Canadian Football League Most Outstanding Player Award winners
Canadian football quarterbacks
Celebrities who have won professional wrestling championships
Chicago Bears players
College football announcers
College Football Hall of Fame inductees
Heisman Trophy winners
Maxwell Award winners
Natick High School alumni
National Football League replacement players
New England Patriots players
New Jersey Generals players
People from Manchester, Maryland
People from Melbourne Beach, Florida
People from Natick, Massachusetts
Players of American football from Florida
Players of American football from Maryland
Players of American football from Massachusetts
Players of Canadian football from Florida
San Diego Chargers players
Sportspeople from Middlesex County, Massachusetts
Sportspeople from the Baltimore metropolitan area
Sportspeople of Lebanese descent
Toronto Argonauts players
United Football League broadcasters
WWE 24/7 Champions